Aljažev Hrib is a local community (krajevna skupnost) in the City Municipality of Celje in Slovenia.

Local communities of the City Municipality of Celje